Ákos Kovrig (born 2 June 1982, ?) is a Hungarian football player who currently plays for Szolnoki MÁV FC in Hungary. The Hungarian plays in the midfield. He can play either centrally or on the left side.

Kovrig previously played for Lombard-Pápa TFC in the NB I.

External links
Nemzeti Sport profile  
kesport.hu: Kormos után Kovrig is repült Szolnokról

References

Hungarian footballers
Hungarian expatriate footballers
Hungarian expatriate sportspeople in Austria
SV Mattersburg players
Expatriate footballers in Israel
Hungarian expatriate sportspeople in Israel
Maccabi Netanya F.C. players
Hapoel Haifa F.C. players
Living people
1982 births
Association football forwards